| highest attendance = 79,000 (play-offs)Stade Français v Clermont13 June 201564,819 (league stage)Toulon v Toulouse28 March 2015
| lowest attendance = 5,000Stade Français v Lyon23 August 2014
| top point scorer =  Jonathan Wisniewski (Grenoble)325 points
| top try scorer   =  David Smith (Toulon)13 tries
| website          = www.lnr.fr/rugby-top-14
| prevseason       = 2013–14
| nextseason       = 2015–16
}}

The 2014–15 Top 14 competition was a French domestic rugby union club competition operated by the Ligue Nationale de Rugby (LNR).  Two new teams from the 2013–14 Pro D2 season were promoted to Top 14 this season, Lyon and La Rochelle in place of the two relegated teams, Perpignan and Biarritz Olympique. Home-and-away play began on 16 August 2014 and ended on 23 May 2015.  This was followed by a playoff stage involving the top six teams, culminating in the final on 13 June 2015.

Teams

Competition format
The top six teams at the end of the regular season (after all the teams played one another twice, once at home, once away) enter a knockout stage to decide the Champions of France.  This consists of three rounds: the teams finishing third to sixth in the table play quarter-finals (hosted by the third and fourth placed teams).  The winners then face the top two teams in the semi-finals, with the winners meeting in the final at Stade de France.

The LNR uses a slightly different bonus points system from that used in most other rugby competitions. It trialled a new system in 2007–08 explicitly designed to prevent a losing team from earning more than one bonus point in a match, a system that also made it impossible for either team to earn a bonus point in a drawn match. LNR chose to continue with this system for subsequent seasons.

France's bonus point system operates as follows:

 4 points for a win.
 2 points for a draw.
 1 bonus point for winning while scoring at least 3 more tries than the opponent. This replaces the standard bonus point for scoring 4 tries regardless of the match result.
 1 bonus point for losing by 5 points (or less). This is a change from previous seasons, in which the margin was 7 points or less.

Table

Relegation
Normally, the teams that finish in 13th and 14th places in the table are relegated to Pro D2 at the end of the season.  In certain circumstances, "financial reasons" may cause a higher placed team to be demoted instead.  This last happened at the end of the 2009–10 season when 12th place Montauban were relegated thereby reprieving 13th place Bayonne.

Fixtures
The outline fixtures schedule was announced on 16 May 2014. Detailed fixtures information evolved as the season progressed (i.e. specific kick off times).

Round 1

Round 2

Round 3

Round 4

Round 5

Round 6

Round 7

Round 8

Round 9

Round 10

Round 11

Round 12

Round 13

Round 14

Round 15

Round 16

Round 17

Round 18

Round 19

Round 20

Round 21

Round 22

Round 23

Round 24

Round 25

Round 26

Playoffs
   
  
All times are in Central European Summer Time (UTC+2).

Quarter-finals

Semi-finals

Final

Top scorers
Note: Flags to the left of player names indicate national team as has been defined under World Rugby eligibility rules, or primary nationality for players who have not yet earned international senior caps. Players may hold one or more non-WR nationalities.

Top points scorers

Top try scorers

Attendances

 Attendances do not include the semi-finals or final as these are at neutral venues.

Notes

References

See also
2014–15 Rugby Pro D2 season

External links
  Ligue Nationale de Rugby – Official Top 14 website
  Midi Olympique

 
Top 14 seasons
 
France